Almenara de Adaja is a municipality located in the province of Valladolid, Castile and León, Spain. According to the 2004 census (INE), the municipality had a population of 37 inhabitants.

References 

Municipalities in the Province of Valladolid